Mariano Rojas (12 June 1973 – 23 June 1996) was a Spanish professional racing cyclist. He rode in the 1995 Tour de France. His brother is José Joaquín Rojas.

References

External links
 

1973 births
1996 deaths
Spanish male cyclists
Cyclists from the Region of Murcia
People from Cieza, Murcia
Road incident deaths in Spain